Os Tincoãs were a Brazilian popular music band from Bahia, primarily active in the 1960s and 1970s. They are named after the Tincoã bird, a subspecies of the Squirrel Cuckoo native to Brazil. The music of Os Tincoãs was heavily influenced by Bahia's Candomblé tradition.

Surviving member Mateus Aleluia is still very active in singing and songwriting. Aleluia moved to Angola in 1983 where he began to develop a cultural research project for the Angolan government. In 2002 he returned to Brazil and in 2010 he debuted with "Cinco Sentidos", his first solo album, produced by the Garimpo label and sponsored by Petrobrás. In 2017 he released "Fogueira Doce", a new album produced independently.

Badú is also a surviving member, who joined Os Tincoãs in 1975 remaining till 1983. He has been living in Gran Canaria island, Spain, for the last 30 years.

Discography
 1961 – Meu Último Bolero
 1973 – Os Tincoãs
 1975 – O Africanto dos Tincoãs
 1977 – Os Tincoãs
 1982 – Os Tincoãs Especial
 1986 – Dadinho e Mateus
 2017 – Nós, Os Tincoãs

References

External links
 Biografia from Luiz Américo's A História da MPB 
 Profile at Bahia Online

Música popular brasileira musical groups
Musical groups established in 1960
Musical groups disestablished in 2000
1960 establishments in Brazil
Culture in Bahia